The 1984 Men's Hockey Champions Trophy was the sixth edition of the Hockey Champions Trophy, an international men's field hockey tournament. It took place from 7 until 14 December 1984 in Karachi, Pakistan. Australia won the tournament for the second time in a row by finishing first in the round-robin tournament.

Teams

Results

Pool

Statistics

Final standings

Goalscorers

External links
Official FIH website

Champions Trophy (field hockey)
Champions Trophy
Hockey Champions Trophy
International field hockey competitions hosted by Pakistan
Sport in Karachi
20th century in Karachi
January 1984 sports events in Asia